Acanthurus achilles, commonly known as Achilles tang or Achilles surgeonfish, is a tropical marine fish native to the Pacific Ocean.

Description
Acanthurus achilles are black with striking orange and white lining along the fish's fins and tail. When the fish matures, a prominent orange drop shape develops on the caudal area, terminating into a sharp spine.

Diet
The Achilles tang is herbivorous, eating mostly benthic algae. They will also accept frozen and meaty foods such as brine shrimp and mysis shrimp in captivity. As with all surgeonfish, algae or similar vegetable matter should be included in their dietary intake to moderate aggression and regulate metabolic functions.

Distribution and habitat
It is found in various reefs of Oceania, up to the islands of Hawaii and Pitcairn. The fish is also, although less commonly, found in the Mariana Islands and even some reefs in southern Mexico and Guatemala.

References

External links

 Achilles Tang care sheet at FishGeeks

Acanthuridae
Acanthurus
Fauna of the Pitcairn Islands
Fish of Mexican Pacific coast
Fish of Hawaii
Fish described in 1803
Fish of Guatemala